Manuel Elías Piña Reyes (born June 5, 1987) is a Venezuelan professional baseball catcher for the Oakland Athletics of Major League Baseball (MLB). He has previously played in MLB for the Kansas City Royals, Milwaukee Brewers and Atlanta Braves.

Career

Texas Rangers organization
Piña began his professional baseball career in 2005 in the Texas Rangers system, hitting .247 in 27 games for the AZL Rangers. He missed most of the 2006 season, as he was  recovering from right elbow surgery. He played for the AZL Rangers again in 2007, hitting .244 in 14 games. In 2007, he played for the Clinton LumberKings, hitting .228 in 86 games. He split 2008 between the Bakersfield Blaze (61 games) and Frisco RoughRiders (23 games), hitting .267 overall. With the RoughRiders again in 2009, he hit .259 in 86 games.

Kansas City Royals
On September 3, 2009, the Rangers traded Piña and outfielder Tim Smith to the Kansas City Royals for Daniel Gutierrez. On July 31, 2011, the Royals added Piña to the Royals' active roster after Matt Treanor was placed on the disabled list. He made his major league debut on August 3, getting two hits in a win over the Baltimore Orioles. He also threw out Vladimir Guerrero while trying to steal second base in the first inning of this game. In 2012, Piña underwent surgery for a meniscus tear in his right knee, and missed the first three months of the season.

On November 2, 2012, the Royals designated Piña for assignment and sent him outright to the Omaha Royals. He began the 2013 season rehabbing from an injury to his right knee's lateral meniscus, and was on the disabled list till June 30.

Seattle Mariners and Detroit Tigers organizations
On January 17, 2014, Piña signed a minor league contract with the Seattle Mariners. On June 11, the Detroit Tigers acquired Piña from the Seattle Mariners in exchange for a player to be named later. He was then assigned to the Tigers' Triple-A affiliate, the Toledo Mud Hens.

Milwaukee Brewers
On December 10, 2015, the Tigers traded Piña to the Milwaukee Brewers as the player to be named later in the Francisco Rodríguez trade to complete the deal. In 2016, he hit .254 with 2 home runs and 12 RBIs in 33 games with the Brewers. He began the 2017 splitting playing time at catcher with Jett Bandy, hitting .279/.327/.424 with career-highs in home runs (9) and RBI (43). In 2018, Piña hit .252/.307/.395, tying his career-high in home runs (9) and getting 28 RBI as well. He began the 2019 season as the backup catcher. He was placed on the disabled list on May 16, 2019, with a hamstring injury. He finished the year with a batting line of .228/.313/.411 with 7 home runs and 25 RBI. In 2020, Piña played in 15 games for the Brewers, slashing .231/.333/.410 with 2 home runs and 5 RBI before his season was cut short in August due to a torn meniscus in his right knee.

Atlanta Braves
After the 2021 season, Piña signed a two-year, $8 million contract with the Atlanta Braves. He was placed on the injured list on April 25, 2022, due to inflammation in his left wrist. While attempting rehabilitation for the injury, Piña felt more discomfort, and a subsequent MRI revealed that surgery would be necessary, for which he missed the remainder of the season.

Oakland Athletics
The Braves sent Piña to the Oakland Athletics in a three-team trade on December 12, 2022, in which the Braves acquired Sean Murphy, the Milwaukee Brewers acquired William Contreras, Joel Payamps, and Justin Yeager, and the Athletics also acquired Esteury Ruiz, Kyle Muller, Freddy Tarnok, and Royber Salinas.

See also
 List of Major League Baseball players from Venezuela

References

External links

1987 births
Living people
Arizona League Royals players
Atlanta Braves players
Bakersfield Blaze players
Bravos de Margarita players
Clinton LumberKings players
Colorado Springs Sky Sox players
Frisco RoughRiders players
Jackson Generals (Southern League) players
Kansas City Royals players
Major League Baseball catchers
Major League Baseball players from Venezuela
Milwaukee Brewers players
Northwest Arkansas Naturals players
Omaha Storm Chasers players
Tacoma Rainiers players
Tiburones de La Guaira players
Toledo Mud Hens players
Venezuelan expatriate baseball players in the United States
Sportspeople from Barquisimeto